The Gran Telescopio Canarias (GranTeCan or GTC) is a  reflecting telescope located at the Roque de los Muchachos Observatory on the island of La Palma, in the Canaries, Spain. It is the world's largest single-aperture optical telescope.

Construction of the telescope took seven years and cost €130 million. Its installation was hampered by weather conditions and the logistical difficulties of transporting equipment to such a remote location. First light was achieved in 2007 and scientific observations began in 2009.

The GTC Project is a partnership formed by several institutions from Spain and Mexico, the University of Florida, the National Autonomous University of Mexico, and the Instituto de Astrofísica de Canarias (IAC). Planning for the construction of the telescope, which started in 1987, involved more than 1,000 people from 100 companies. The division of telescope time reflects the structure of its financing: 90% Spain, 5% Mexico and 5% the University of Florida.

History

First light 
The GTC began its preliminary observations on 13 July 2007, using 12 segments of its primary mirror, made of Zerodur glass-ceramic by the German company Schott AG. Later, the number of segments was increased to a total of 36 hexagonal segments fully controlled by an active optics control system, working together as a reflective unit. Its first instrument was the Optical System for Imaging and low Resolution Integrated Spectroscopy (OSIRIS). Scientific observations began in May 2009.

Inauguration ceremony 
The Gran Telescopio Canarias formally opened its shutters on July 24, 2009, inaugurated by King Juan Carlos I of Spain. More than 500 astronomers, government officials and journalists from Europe and the Americas attended the ceremony.

MEGARA

MEGARA (Multi-Espectrografo en GTC de Alta Resolucion para Astronomia) is an optical integral-field and multi-object spectrograph covering the visible light and near infrared wavelength range between 0.365 and 1 µm with a spectral resolution in the range R=6000-20000. The MEGARA IFU (also called the Large Compact Bundle, or LCB) offers a contiguous field of view of 12.5 arcsec x 11.3 arcsec, while the multiobject spectroscopy mode allows 92 objects to be observed simultaneously in a field of view of 3.5 arcmin x 3.5 arcmin by means of an equal number of robotic positioners. Both the LCB and MOS modes make use of 100 µm-core optical fibers (1267 in total) that are attached to a set of microlens arrays (with 623 spaxels in the case of the LCB and 92x7 in the case of the MOS) with each microlens covering an hexagonal region of 0.62 arcsec in diameter.

CanariCam 
The University of Florida's CanariCam is a mid-infrared imager with spectroscopic, coronagraphic, and polarimetric capabilities. Since 2012, it had been operating in queue mode at one of the Nasmyth focus stations, until it was temporarily decommissioned in April 2016. Following an upgrade project, started in mid-2018, it has been installed and recommissioned (December 2019) on a different folded-Cassegrain focus providing superior performance with the instrument.

CanariCam is designed as a diffraction-limited imager. It is optimized as an imager, and although it will offer a range of other observing modes, these will not compromise the imaging capability. CanariCam works in the thermal infrared between approximately 7.5 and 25 μm. At the short-wavelength end, the cut-off is determined by the atmosphere—specifically atmospheric seeing. At the long wavelength end, the cut-off is determined by the detector; this loses sensitivity beyond around 24 μm, although the cut-off for individual detectors varies significantly. CanariCam is a very compact design. It is expected that the total weight of the cryostat and its on-telescope electronics will be under 400 kg. Most previous mid-infrared instruments have used liquid helium as a cryogen; one of the requirements of CanariCam was that it should require no expensive and difficult to handle cryogens.

CanariCam has been decommissioned .

OSIRIS

The IAC's OSIRIS (Optical System for Imaging and low Resolution Integrated Spectroscopy), is an imager and spectrograph covering wavelengths from 0.365 to 1.05 µm. It has a field of view (FOV) of 7 × 7 arcmin for direct imaging, and 8 arcmin × 5.2 arcmin for low resolution spectroscopy. For spectroscopy, it offers tunable filters.

See also 
 Other observatory sites
 La Silla Observatory
 Mauna Kea Observatories
 Paranal Observatory
 Lists and comparisons
 Extremely large telescope
 List of largest optical reflecting telescopes
 List of largest optical telescopes historically

References

External links 

 Gran Telescopio Canarias
 GTC News
 Instituto de Astrofísica de Canarias (IAC)
 University of Florida CanariCam 
  Consejo Nacional de Ciencia y Tecnología de México
  Instituto de Astronomía de la Universidad Nacional Autónoma de México
 CBC article—Giant Canary Islands telescope captures first light
 Images
 Gran Telescopo Canarias inauguration press dossier (in English)
 

Astronomical observatories in La Palma
Optical telescopes
National Autonomous University of Mexico
University of Florida